Lee Won-tae is a South Korean film director, screenwriter and producer. Formerly working as a producer on programs for MBC TV, Lee debuted with the period prison drama Man of Will in 2017. Prior to that, he also served as producer on the 2011 horror romcom Spellbound and penned the original story for the 2015 period film The Magician. His second feature, The Gangster, The Cop, The Devil, was invited to the Cannes Film Festival in 2019. An upcoming American remake of the film was announced in May 2019, with Sylvester Stallone and Braden Aftergood producing and Ma Dong-seok reprising his role in the remake.

Filmography

References

External links 
 
 

Year of birth missing (living people)
Living people
South Korean film directors
South Korean screenwriters
South Korean film producers